Sadhana better known by her stage name Shari is an Indian actress. She was a prominent lead actress from 1982 to 1995 in Malayalam, Tamil, Kannada, and Telugu films.

Personal life

Sadhana was born to Subramaniam and Lakshmi Devi in Andhra Pradesh. She is a trained classical dancer who learned Bharata Natyam from Padma Subrahmanyam and Kuchipudi from Vempati Chinna Satyam. She had her primary education from Saraswathi Vidyalaya Matriculation Higher Secondary School, Chennai. She is the grand daughter of famous Kannada actress B. Ramadevi.

She married Kumar, a businessman, in 1991. They have a daughter, Kalyani born in 1996.
She resides with her family in Chennai.

Career

She rose to fame after Namukku Parkkan Munthiri Thoppukal (1986). She received a Kerala State film award for the same. In the Tamil industry, she is known as Sadhana. She received her first offer in a supporting role in Hitler Umanath in 1982 where she played Sivaji Ganesan's daughter. However she gained attention in her role as the heroine in Nenjathai Allitha (1984) where she was paired with actor Mohan.

Awards

 1986 Kerala State Film Award for Best Actress - Namukku Parkkan Munthiri Thoppukal
 1986 Kerala State Film Critics Award -  second best actress - Namukku Parkkan Munthiri Thoppukal
 1986 Filmfare Award - Best Actress - Namukku Parkkan Munthiri Thoppukal
2017 Flowers TV awards - Best supporting actress -Nilavum Nakshatrangalum
2017 Vijay Television Awards for Best Mamiyar-Fiction - Kalyanam mudhal Kadhal varai

Filmography

Malayalam

 Ningalil Oru Sthree (1984) as Sindhu
  Namukku Parkkan Munthiri Thoppukal (1986) as Sofia
  Desatanakkili Karayarilla (1986) as Sally
  Onnu Muthal Poojyam Vare (1986) as Elizabeth
  Athinumappuram (1987) as Shobha
  Oru Maymasa Pulariyil (1987) as Suicided lady
  Ithaa Samayamaayi (1987) as Leelamma
  Naaradan Keralathil (1987) as Kousalya
  Nirabhedangal (1987) as Susie
  Kalathinte Shabdam (1987) as Radha
  Theertham (1987) as Mercy
  Kottum Kuravayum (1987) as Rani
  Ithente Neethi (1987) as 
  Archanapookkal (1987) as Saritha
  Jaithra Yaathra (1987) as Geetha
  Ponnu (1987) as Maya
  Nombarathi Poovu(1987) as Anitha
  Aankiliyude Tharattu (1987) as Sridevi
  Vilambaram (1987) as Valsala
  Veendum Lisa (1987) as Lisa
  Ellaavarkkum Nanmakal (1987) as Balan's lover
  Aparan (1988) as Anna
  Onninu Purake Mattonnu (1988) as Molly
  Thaala (1988) as Thaala
  Ponmuttayidunna Tharavu (1988) as Dance teacher
  Rahasyam Paramarahasyam (1988) as Deepa
  Season (1989) as Indira
  Mrigaya (1989) as Selina
  Jeevitham Oru Raagam (1989) as Chithra
  Jaathakam (1989) as Shyamala
  Maharaajaavu (1989) as 
  Kelikottu (1990) as Usha
  Commander (1990) as Bharathi
  Thaalam (1990)
  Kalikkalam (1990) as Meera Nair
  Maanmizhiyaal (1990) as Lakshmi
  Sthreekku Vendi Sthree (1990) as Mrs. Rajesh/Advocate
  Utharakandam (1991)
  Arangu (1991) as Alice
  Kanalkkattu (1991) as Sathi
  Ennum Nanmakal (1991) as Rama
  Savidham (1992) as Tessy
  Annu Good Friday (1992) as
  Aadhaaram (1992) as Amina
  Simhadhwani (1992) as Sarala
  Mahan (1992) as Jackson's sister
  Aachaaryan (1993) as Sumithra
  Sundharimaare Sookshikkika (1995) as Priya
 Sayahnam (2000) as Amala's mother
  Njaan Raajaavu (2002) as Stella
  Basket (2002) as Saradha
  Mayamohithachandran (2003)
  Raakilipattu (2007) as Arundhathi
  Chocolate (2007) as Eleena John
  Positive (2008) as Winnie's mother
  Sulthan (2008) as Nishi's mother
  Novel (2008) as Manju
  LollyPop (2008) as Jennifer's real mother
  Pulliman (2010)
  Mummy & Me (2010) as Mary Thomas
  Mohabbath (2011) as Sajna's mother
  Doctor Love (2011) as Ebin's mother
  Snehaadaram (2011) 
  Ee Dhanya Muhoorttham (2011)
  Kadhayile Nayika (2011) as Sophiya
  Sandwich (2011) as Sreedevi
  Bombay March 12 (2011) as Shajahan's mother
  Karppooradeepam (2012) as Meritta 
  Kalikalam (2012) as Meenakshi
  Padmasree Bharat Dr. Saroj Kumar (2012) as Shyam's mother
  Maad Dad (2013) as Sarala
  Rebecca Uthup Kizhakkemala (2013) as Soshamma
  Orissa (2013) as Christhudas's mother
  Red Rain (2013) as Victim's mother
  Vasanthathinte Kanal Vazhikalil (2014) as Theyi 
  Bad Boys (2014) 
  Law Point (2014) as Umadevi
 Jilebi (2015) as Silpa's mother
  Kannirinum Madhuram (2016)  as Dr. Seethalakshmi
 Boby (2017) as Archive footage/Uncredited cameo (from :Namukku Parkkan Munthiri Thoppukal)
 Meenakshi (2017) as Rohan's mother
 Aquarium (2022) as Mother Superior
 Jana Gana Mana (2022) as Shabana
 Viddikalude Mash (2022) as Janaki
Saturday Night  (2022) as Nirmala Davis 
 Kunjamminis Hospital

Tamil

Hitler Umanath (1982) - Umanath's daughter (debut)
Nenjathai Allitha (1984) - Debut as heroine, Radhika
Vai Sollil Veeranadi (1984) - Nagalakshmi
Arthamulla Aasaigal (1985) - Jaya
Chain Jayapal (1985) - Padma
Sithirame Sithirame (1985)
Unnai Thedi Varuven (1985) - Anita
Kulirkaala Megangal (1986) - Vasi
Mamiyargal Jakkirathai (1986)
Naanum Oru Thozhilali (1986) - Padma
Raja Mariyadhai (1987) - Meena
My Dear Lisa (1987) - Lisa
Kavalan Avan Kovalan (1987) - Special appearance
Raththa Dhanam (1988) - Radha
Enne Petha Raasa (1989) - Catherine
Vaaliba Vilayattu (1990) - Parvathi
Pathimoonam Number Veedu (1990) - Annam
Manaivi Oru Manickam (1990) - Female Serpent
Vetri Karangal (1991) - Radha/Kalpana (dual role)
Ponnuketha Purushan (1992) - Anandhi
Veeramani (1994) - Special appearance
Raja Enga Raja (1995) - Prabha
Nenjinile (1999) - Karunakaran's sister
Snegithiye (2000) - Arundati
James Pandu (2000) - Guest role
Love Channel (2001) - Parimalam
Pudhiya Geethai (2003) - Jo's mother
Thotti Jaya (2005) - Brinda's mother
Ammuvagiya Naan (2007) - Rani
Oru Ponnu Oru Paiyan (2007)
Aadatha Aattamellam (2009) - Kannan's mother
Yennamo Yedho (2014) - Anuradha

Kannada
Thayiya Nudi (1983)
Onde Guri (1983)
Samayada Gombe (1984) as Mangala
Brahma Gantu (1985)
Sita Anjaneya (1993)
Chandra Chakori (2003)

Telugu
Mugguru Ammayila Mogudu (1983)
Iddaru Kiladilu (1983)
Moogavani Paga(1983)
Manchi Varu Maavaru (1989) as Radha
Lady Inspector (1991) as Dr. Madhuri Devi
Peddarikam (1992) as Chandra Shekarudu's wife
Teja (1992) as Sarada

Television

Television series -Malayalam

Television series - Tamil

Television series -Telugu

References

 
 http://cinidiary.com/peopleinfo.php?pigsection=Actor&picata=1&no_of_displayed_rows=7&no_of_rows_page=10&sletter=A

External links
 
 Shari at MSI

Kerala State Film Award winners
Actresses in Malayalam cinema
Indian film actresses
Actresses in Tamil cinema
Actresses in Kannada cinema
Actresses in Telugu cinema
Living people
Place of birth missing (living people)
20th-century Indian actresses
21st-century Indian actresses
Indian television actresses
Actresses in Malayalam television
Actresses in Tamil television
Actresses from Andhra Pradesh
Actresses in Telugu television
Year of birth missing (living people)